Konarak County is in Sistan and Baluchestan province, Iran. The capital of the county is the city of Konarak. At the 2006 census, the county's population was 68,605 in 31,449 households. The following census in 2011 counted 82,001 people in 18,704 households. At the 2016 census, the county's population was 98,212 in 23,600 households. After the census, Zarabad District was separated from the county to form Zarabad County.

Administrative divisions

The population history and structural changes of Konarak County's administrative divisions over three consecutive censuses are shown in the following table. The latest census shows two districts, four rural districts, and two cities.

References

 

Counties of Sistan and Baluchestan Province